Richard Paz (born 2 November 1968) is a Filipino windsurfer. He competed at the 1988 Summer Olympics and the 1992 Summer Olympics.

References

External links
 
 

1968 births
Living people
Filipino windsurfers
Filipino male sailors (sport)
Olympic sailors of the Philippines
Sailors at the 1988 Summer Olympics – Division II
Sailors at the 1992 Summer Olympics – Lechner A-390
Asian Games competitors for the Philippines
Sailors at the 1994 Asian Games
Sailors at the 1998 Asian Games
Southeast Asian Games medalists in sailing
Competitors at the 1987 Southeast Asian Games
Place of birth missing (living people)